Château de Reichenstein may refer to:

 Château de Reichenstein (Kientzheim)
 Château de Reichenstein (Riquewihr)